"Goodnight, Ladies" is a folk song attributed to Edwin Pearce Christy, originally intended to be sung during a minstrel show. Drawing from an 1847 song by Christy entitled "Farewell, Ladies", the song as known today was first published on May 16, 1867.

The "Merrily We Roll Along" chorus has the same melody as "Mary Had A Little Lamb".

Charles Ives quoted the song in A Symphony: New England Holidays (1897-1913): I. Washington's Birthday, toward the end of the movement.

Meredith Willson features the piece as the tenth number in The Music Man (1957).

Bing Crosby included the song in a medley on his album 101 Gang Songs (1961).

Lyrics
VERSE I: Goodnight, ladies! Goodnight, ladies! Goodnight, ladies! We're going to leave you now.

CHORUS: Merrily we roll along, roll along, roll along. Merrily we roll along, o'er the dark blue sea.

VERSE II: Farewell, Ladies! Farewell, ladies! Farewell, ladies! We're going to leave you now.

CHORUS

VERSE III: Sweet dreams, ladies! Sweet dreams, ladies! Sweet dreams, ladies! We're going to leave you now.

CHORUS

See also
I've Been Working on the Railroad
Mary Had a Little Lamb
Merrily We Roll Along
Nice One Cyril

References

External links

1867 songs
American folk songs